Tudor Pamfile (11 June 1883 – 21 October 1921) was a Romanian writer.

Tudor Pamfile was born on 11 June 1883 in the village of Țepu in Tecuci County (now in Galați County). He attended primary school and the gymnasium in Tecuci, and then transferred to the Military School in Bucharest. During his studies, he was befriended by Ioan Bianu, who introduced him to the literary circles of Bucharest. Upon graduation he was assigned to the Third Roșiori Regiment in Bârlad.

Tudor Pamfile's work, as a writer was significantly influenced by ethnographer and folklorist Simeon Florea Marian. Pamfile himself is counted among prominent folklorists. He, together with Arthur Gorovei, have been credited with being the first scholars to collect genuine Romanian folktales.

Pamfile was editor of the magazines Ion Creangă and Miron Costin, both published in Bârlad. He also supported the magazine Freamătul initially published in Tecuci, but which moved to Bârlad. He wrote several ethnographic studies and contributed to the magazines Șezătoarea, Analele Academiei Române, Convorbiri Literare, Floarea darurilor, Însemnări literare, Lamura, Viața Românească, Viața literară și artistică and Lumina poporului.

Pamfile died on 21 October 1921 in Chișinău (now in Moldova).

Works
 Jocuri de copii (3 volumes), București, 1906–1909
 Cartea pentru tineret de la sate București, 1907 (with Mihai Lupescu and L. Mrejeriu
 Povestire pe scurt despre neamul românesc – Bârlad, 1907
 Cimilituri românești  – București, 1908
 Craiul vremurilor (stories) – Vălenii de Munte, 1909
 Feţi frumoşi de odinioară (stories) – București, 1910
 Industria casnică la Români. Trecutul și starea ei de astăzi – București, 1910
 Sărbătorile de vară la români "Summer Holidays of the Romanians" – București, 1910
 Boli și leacuri la oameni, vite şi păsări – București, 1911
 Firișoare de aur (stories and legends) – București, 1911
 Sfârșitul lumii după credințele poporului român – Bârlad, 1911
 Culegere de colinde, cîntece de stea, vicleime, sorcove şi plugușoare, întocmite pentru folosul tineretului ce urează la Crăciun și Anul Nou – București, 1912
 Culegere de ghicitori românești (cimilituri) – București, 1912
 Agricoltura la români – București, 1913
 Cântece de țară – București, 1913
 Povestea lumii de demult "Story of the World of Yore" – București, 1913
 Cromatica poporului român (with Mihai Lupescu) – București, 1914
 Diavolul învrăjbitor al lumii – București, 1914
 Însemnări cu privire la moșia, satul și biserica de la Strîmba din comuna Puiești, județul Tutova (with V. C. Nicolau) – Bîrlad, 1914)
 Sărbătorile de toamnă și postul Crăciunului – București, 1914
 Sărbătorile la români. Crăciunul – București, 1914
 Un tăciune şi-un cărbune. (stories) – București, 1914
 Dragostea în datina tineretului român
 Pământul după credinţele poporului Român. 
 Văzduhul după credințele poporului Român (with )
 Cerul și podoabele lui, după credințele poporului Român  (with Antoaneta Olteanu)
 Mitologie românească

References

External links

Romanian writers
Romanian ethnographers
Romanian folklorists
People from Galați County
1883 births
1923 deaths